Minto is a suburb of Sydney, in the state of New South Wales, Australia. Minto is located 38 kilometres south-west of the Sydney central business district, in the local government area of the City of Campbelltown and is part of the Macarthur region.

History
Minto was named in honour of the Earl of Minto, Gilbert Elliot-Murray-Kynynmound, who was Viceroy of India from 1807–1814. The name was originally given to the entire district stretching from just north of Appin up to what is now Denham Court.

The area that constitutes the current suburb of Minto was originally home to the indigenous Tharawal people until the arrival of European settlers from the First Fleet. In 1811, Governor Lachlan Macquarie granted  in the area to William Redfern, the colony's first surgeon. He in turn named it Campbellfield after Macquarie's wife Elizabeth whose maiden name was Campbell. Redfern used the property as a vineyard and sheep station.

In 1810, Dr Robert Towson built his sandstock home, Varroville, in St Andrews Road, on land granted by Governor Macquarie. The house was subsequently owned by Charles Sturt and James Raymond, the first Postmaster General. In the 1820s, Colonel Parker built a Georgian bungalow called Epping Forest in Raby Road. A farm called Robin Hood Farm was built in Campbelltown Road circa 1830. These three properties are now listed on the Register of the National Estate.

In 1874, a railway station was built in the area and named Campbellfield after the property but this led to confusion with nearby Campbelltown so in 1882, it was renamed Minto. Development of the area followed shortly after and by the 1950s it was a village of around 500 people.

A large slice of land on the east side of Minto was sold to Housing Commission in 1969 to provide cheap housing. Shortly after a large industrial estate was also established in the area and Minto's transition from village to Sydney suburb was complete.

Heritage listings 
Minto has a number of heritage-listed sites, including:
 Lot 315 Ben Lomond Road: Stone Cottage, Minto

Transport 
Minto railway station is serviced by the Airport & South Line on the Sydney Trains network. Minto also has a small inland port connected by rail to Port Botany.  The inland port consists of a single rail siding with an adjacent hard stand surface for the containers, and the siding is operated by top and tail trains with engines at both ends.

Schools
Minto is home to two high schools, Sarah Redfern High and Alfaisal College; five primary schools, Campbellfield Public, Minto Public, Sarah Redfern Public, The Grange Public and Alfaisal College; and a special school, Passfield Park, which services disabled students from pre-school through to high school.

Rugby League players, Michael Lett, Gray Vaine, Justin Brooker, John Skandalis, Ken McGuinness, Kevin McGuinness, Israel Folau, Mickey, Lopini and Lelea Paea, Tim Lafai, Byron Fruean and Dominique Peyroux all attended Sarah Redfern High School, a notable rugby league school.

Housing
Public housing belonging to Housing NSW has recently been demolished in the suburb to make way for a new housing estate called One Minto. This decision had been made in an attempt to break the generational cycle of a socially disadvantaged suburb that the Minto estate had infamously been known for over the past few decades. Because of this concentration of disadvantage, the One Minto Estate experienced a range of social issues including high unemployment and poor health, low income, high percentage of single parent families, a lack of access to educational opportunities and other services and high crime rates. The majority of the houses will be private with around 850 privately owned houses compared to only 360 public housing homes. The public housing has been evenly spread among the suburb, in efforts to prevent concentrated areas of welfare dependency. 

Although the One Minto estate sits at approximately 30 percent public housing, the suburb as a whole has 15 percent in total.

People

Demographics

At the 2016 census, there were 12,551 people in Minto. 
Aboriginal  and Torres Strait Islander people made up 3.2% of the population.
 50.9% of people were born in Australia. The most common countries of birth were Bangladesh 7.0%, India 4.5%, New Zealand 4.0%, Philippines 3.7% and Fiji 3.6%.
 48.0% of people only spoke English at home. Other languages spoken at home included Bengali 10.2%, Hindi 4.8%, Samoan 3.8%, Nepali 3.1% and Arabic 2.8%.
 The most common responses for religion were Catholic 21.4%, Islam 16.9%, No Religion 13.4%, Anglican 10.8% and Hinduism 9.7%.
 The median weekly household income was $1,083, lower than the national median of $1,438.

Notable residents 
 Rugby league players Israel Folau, Jarryd Hayne and Krisnan Inu all grew up within a few blocks of each other in Minto and played park football together. Mickey Paea and Tim Lafai also known in Minto as good helpers of the Minto Cobras team both players give up their time to help the Minto Cobras out every week in their extra time.
 Member of the Parliament of New South Wales and former Housing Minister Cherie Burton grew up in Minto.

Sport and recreation

The Minto Indoor Sports Centre is home to local basketball and netball teams. The Macarthur Heat plays in the New South Wales State Basketball League and uses the Centre as its home court. The Campbelltown District Netball Association, which is also based at the Centre, plays in the third division of the Netball NSW State League.

Minto has a rugby league team, the Minto Cobras playing in the Western Suburbs District Junior Rugby League. The Cobras home ground is Townson Oval.  They have produced a number of NRL players including Israel Folau, Michael Lett, Gray Vaine, Justin Brooker, John Skandalis, Ken McGuinness, Kevin McGuinness, Jarryd Hayne, Mickey Lopini, Lalea Paea, Krisnan Inu and Tim Lafai. Mickey Paea, a current Bulldogs forward, always gives up his extra time and helps out Minto Cobras.  The club is proud of him for doing that because not many NRL players would give up spare time to go visit the clubs where they played their junior footy.

Controversy

Minto has received negative publicity on two occasions because of a local shopping centre, Minto Mall, which has been investigated twice on the news program A Current Affair. Although it began as a boost to local business, it has more recently become dilapidated and untidy, and the management has taken no action to combat these problems. After being placed under pressure by A Current Affair and members of the community due to the rundown state of the mall, Minto Mall sold in late 2012.

Since 2014, the former Minto Mall has fully reopened and refurbished as Minto Marketplace. It is populated by major retailers and franchises such as Woolworths, Kmart, Priceline, Lowes Menswear, Gloria Jeans, Michel's Patisserie, Donut King, Ocean Master, Millers and many more.

References

External links

  [CC-By-SA]

Suburbs of Sydney
Rail yards in Australia
Populated places established in 1882
1882 establishments in Australia
City of Campbelltown (New South Wales)